The HD PENTAX-D FA 150-450mm F4.5-5.6 ED DC AW is a super-telezoom lens for Pentax K-mount. Optically, it features extra low dispersion (ED) elements as well as HD, SP (Super Protect) and Bright Aero coatings. It is weather sealed and supports quick shift.

See also 
Pentax (lens)

External links
Product specifications on official page
Pentax Story series part about the D FA 150-450mm

150-450
Camera lenses introduced in 2015